2 Chronicles 28 is the twenty-eighth chapter of the Second Book of Chronicles the Old Testament in the Christian Bible or of the second part of the Books of Chronicles in the Hebrew Bible. The book is compiled from older sources by an unknown person or group, designated by modern scholars as "the Chronicler", and had the final shape established in late fifth or fourth century BCE. This chapter belongs to the section focusing on the kingdom of Judah until its destruction by the Babylonians under Nebuchadnezzar and the beginning of restoration under Cyrus the Great of Persia  (2 Chronicles 10 to 36). The focus of this chapter is the reign of Ahaz, king of Judah.

Text
This chapter was originally written in the Hebrew language and is divided into 27 verses.

Textual witnesses
Some early manuscripts containing the text of this chapter in Hebrew are of the Masoretic Text tradition, which includes the Codex Leningradensis (1008). A fragment containing a part of this chapter was found among the Dead Sea Scrolls, that is, 4Q118 (4QChr; 50–25 BCE) with extant verse 27.

There is also a translation into Koine Greek known as the Septuagint, made in the last few centuries BCE. Extant ancient manuscripts of the Septuagint version include Codex Vaticanus (B; B; 4th century), and Codex Alexandrinus (A; A; 5th century).

Old Testament references
: 
: 
:

Ahaz, king of Judah (28:1–4)
Ahaz's reign was dominated by the Syro-Ephraimite war, against the kingdoms of Israel
and Aram, due to Ahaz's wicked way and refusal to convert. 
His reign marks the unmitigated decline of the kingdom of Judah.

Verse 1
Ahaz was twenty years old when he began to reign, and he reigned sixteen years in Jerusalem. And he did not do what was right in the eyes of the Lord, as his father David had done,
Cross references: 2 Kings 15:33; 
 "16 years": according to Thiele's chronology, Ahaz became co-regent  in September 735 BCE, then as sole king for 16 years between September 732 BCE and September 731  BCE until he died a few weeks (or days) before Nisan 715 BCE. A royal bulla (seal) with the inscription: "Belonging to Ahaz (son of) Yehotam (=Jotham), King of Judah" was discovered and authenticated.

Judah were defeated by enemies (28:5–21)
A possible opportunity of Israel reunification by northern kingdom's subjugation of Judah was prevented by God's word through the prophet Oded (verses 9–11) and some chiefs of the Ephraimites (verses 9–11), so the army of Israel treated the captives from Judah humanely (a mirror image of 2 Chronicles 13, in which Judah and Israel have exchanged their roles). Some details of the good treatments by the people of "Samaria" in verses 9–15 are apparently underlined in the well-known story of "the Good Samaritans" in the Gospel of Luke. While Ahaz sought and waited for Tiglath-pileser's support (not recorded in the Chronicles, the books of Kings note that later Tiglath-pileser accepted the offer, defeated Damascus, deported its citizens, and killed king Rezin), the Edomites (verse 17) and the Philistines (verse 18) had successfully defeated Judah. Verses 20–21 emphasize that Tiglath-pileser did not really come to help, because he extorted heavy tribute from Judah.

Apostasy and death of Ahaz (28:22–27)
Verses 22–25 record the cultic sins of Ahaz as he worshipped for the gods of
Damascus, the land that defeated him, and abandoned the worship of YHWH.

Verse 15
And the men who have been mentioned by name rose and took the captives, and with the spoil they clothed all who were naked among them. They clothed them, gave them sandals, provided them with food and drink, and anointed them, and carrying all the feeble among them on donkeys, they brought them to their kinsfolk at Jericho, the city of palm trees. Then they returned to Samaria.
 "Clothed them, gave them sandals":  alluding the 'miserable destitution of captives' (cf. Isaiah 3:24; Isaiah 20:2; Isaiah 20:4, "naked and barefoot").    
This verse displays the strongest parallels with Luke 10 (Luke 10:30, 33–34).

See also

Related Bible parts: 2 Kings 16,  2 Chronicles 27, Isaiah 1, Luke 10

Notes

References

Sources

 

 
 Thiele, Edwin R., The Mysterious Numbers of the Hebrew Kings, (1st ed.; New York: Macmillan, 1951; 2d ed.; Grand Rapids: Eerdmans, 1965; 3rd ed.; Grand Rapids: Zondervan/Kregel, 1983).

External links
 Jewish translations:
 Divrei Hayamim II - II Chronicles - Chapter 28 (Judaica Press) in Hebrew and English translation [with Rashi's commentary] at Chabad.org
 Christian translations:
 Online Bible at GospelHall.org (ESV, KJV, Darby, American Standard Version, Bible in Basic English)
 2 Chronicles Chapter 28. Bible Gateway

28